2015 Regional League Division 2 Central & Eastern  Region is the 7th season of the League competition since its establishment in 2009. It is in the third tier of the Thai football league system.

Changes from Last Season

Team Changes

Promoted Clubs

No club was promoted to the Thai Division 1 League. Last years league champions Prachinburi United and runners up Maptaphut Rayong failed to qualify from the 2014 Regional League Division 2 championsleague round.

Relegated Clubs

Sriracha Ban Bueng were relegated from the 2014 Thai Division 1 League.

Renamed Clubs 

 Maptaphut Rayong renamed Marines Maptaphut.
 Sriracha Ban Bueng renamed Tawee Wattana.

Withdrawn Clubs

Pakchong United and TG Rayong have withdrawn from the 2015 campaign.

Expansion Clubs

Kaeng Khoi TRU joined the newly expanded league setup.

Stadium and locations

League table

See also
 2015 Thai Premier League
 2015 Thai Division 1 League
 2015 Regional League Division 2
 2015 Thai FA Cup
 2015 Thai League Cup
 2015 Kor Royal Cup

References

External links
 Football Association of Thailand

Regional League Central-East Division seasons